Dread is a live album by Living Colour released only in Japan September 23, 1993. It contains live recordings from the Stain tour, an acoustic radio session and two B-sides. The live recordings were recorded on 7 June 1993 at Le Zenith in Paris, France, and at a concert on 24 April 1993 at the Riviera Theatre in Chicago. The radio session was recorded for a Dutch radio show called Countdown Café in February 1993. Both of the B-sides were recorded during the Stain sessions.

Track listing

Personnel
 Corey Glover - vocals
 Vernon Reid - guitar
 Doug Wimbish - bass
 Will Calhoun - drums

Living Colour albums
1993 live albums